Rose Marie (born Rose Marie Mazzetta; August 15, 1923 – December 28, 2017) was an American actress, singer, comedian, and vaudeville performer with a career ultimately spanning nine decades, which included film, radio, records, theater, night clubs and television. As a child performer during the years just after the silent film era, she had a successful singing career under the stage name Baby Rose Marie.

Rose Marie was widely known for her role on the CBS situation comedy The Dick Van Dyke Show (1961–1966), as television comedy writer Sally Rogers, "who went toe-to-toe in a man’s world". Later, she portrayed Myrna Gibbons on The Doris Day Show and was a featured celebrity on The Hollywood Squares for 14 years.

She is the subject of a 2017 documentary film, Wait for Your Laugh, which includes interviews with her and her co-stars including Carl Reiner, Dick Van Dyke, Peter Marshall, and Tim Conway.

Early life
Rose Marie was born Rose Marie Mazzetta in Manhattan, New York, on August 15, 1923, to Polish-American Stella Gluszcak and Italian-American vaudeville actor Frank Mazzetta, who went by the name of Frank Curley.  Her mother took her to see local vaudeville shows regularly and afterwards, Rose Marie would sing what she had heard for neighbors, who eventually entered her in a talent contest. At the age of three, Marie started performing under the name "Baby Rose Marie". At five, she was offered a seven-year contract and became a radio star on the NBC Radio Network and made a series of films.

Rose Marie later recalled:

“I had a deep voice, not like Shirley Temple but more like Sophie Tucker. I never sounded like a child so there were some people who thought I was really a 30-year-old midget.”

To counteract these rumors, NBC arranged for her to undertake a national stage tour, and she appeared in a few short films including "Baby Rose Marie the Child Wonder" (1929).

At the height of her fame as a child singer, from late 1929 to 1934, Rose Marie had her own radio show, made numerous records, and was featured in a number of Paramount films and shorts. She continued to appear in films through the mid-1930s, making shorts and one feature picture, International House (1933), with W. C. Fields for Paramount.

As she entered adulthood, Rose Marie turned to nightclub and lounge performances. According to her autobiography Hold the Roses, she was assisted in her career by many members of organized crime, including Al Capone and Bugsy Siegel. Rose Marie secured work at the Flamingo Hotel in Las Vegas, Nevada, which was built by Siegel. Because of the Flamingo's organized crime ties, she had to seek permission to perform in other casinos and remained loyal to "the boys" at the Flamingo for the rest of her life.

Concurrently with her nightclub work, the young adult Rose Marie continued to work in radio, earning the nickname "Darling of the Airwaves".

Recordings

In 1929,  five-year-old Rose Marie made a Vitaphone sound short titled Baby Rose Marie the Child Wonder. Between 1930 and 1938, she made 17 recordings, three of which were not issued. Her first issued record, recorded on March 10, 1932, featured accompaniment by Fletcher Henderson's orchestra, one of the leading African American jazz orchestras of the day. Henderson and the band were said to be in the RCA Victor studios recording the four songs they were intending to produce that day and were asked to accompany Baby Rose Marie, reading from a stock arrangement.

Rose Marie's recording of "Say That You Were Teasing Me" (backed with "Take a Picture of the Moon", Victor 22960), featuring Henderson's orchestra, was a national hit in 1932. According to Joel Whitburn, Rose Marie was the last surviving entertainer to have charted a hit before World War II.

Television
In the 1960–1961 season, Marie co-starred with Shirley Bonne, Elaine Stritch, Jack Weston, Raymond Bailey, and Stubby Kaye in My Sister Eileen.

After five seasons (1961–1966) as Sally Rogers on The Dick Van Dyke Show, Rose Marie co-starred in two seasons (1969–1971) of The Doris Day Show as Doris Martin's friend and co-worker Myrna Gibbons. She also appeared in two episodes of The Monkees in the mid-1960s. She later had a semi-regular seat in the upper center square on the original version of The Hollywood Squares. Because contestants tended to pick corner squares first, the phrase "Rose Marie to block" was uttered so often she frequently joked that she should legally change her name to that.

Rose Marie performed on three 1966 and 1967 episodes of The Dean Martin Show on NBC and also twice (1964 and 1968) on The Hollywood Palace on ABC.

In the mid-1970s, Rose Marie appeared in the recurring role of Hilda on the police drama S.W.A.T.. Hilda brought fresh doughnuts, made coffee for the team, and provided some comic relief.

In the early 1990s, Rose Marie had a recurring role as Frank Fontana's mother on Murphy Brown.

She appeared as Roy Biggins' domineering mother Eleanor "Bluto" Biggins in an episode of Wings.

Rose Marie and Morey Amsterdam appeared together in an October 1993 episode of Herman's Head and guest-starred in a February 1996 episode of Caroline in the City, shortly before Amsterdam's death in October of that same year.

Theater
Rose Marie appeared opposite Phil Silvers in the hit Broadway Musical Top Banana in 1951, also appearing in the well-received 1954 film adaptation. She later claimed that her musical numbers were cut from the film in retaliation for her publicly refusing the producer's sexual advances. Near the end of her life, she testified that it was the only time she had ever experienced sexual harassment in the entertainment industry in her 90-year career.

In 1965, Rose Marie appeared in the Dallas production of Bye Bye Birdie as Mae Peterson, the mother of the character played by Dick Van Dyke on Broadway and in the film.

From 1977 to 1985,  Rose Marie co-starred with Rosemary Clooney, Helen O'Connell, and Margaret Whiting in the musical revue 4 Girls 4, which toured the United States and appeared on television several times.

Rose Marie was the celebrity guest host of a comedy play, Grandmas Rock!, written by Gordon Durich.  It was originally broadcast on radio in 2010 on KVTA and KKZZ, and rebroadcast on KVTA and KKZZ again in September 2012 in honor of National Grandparents Day.

Personal life
Rose Marie was married to trumpeter Bobby Guy from 1946 until his death in 1964. The couple had one daughter, television producer Georgiana Guy Rodrigues.

Though it was presented in the press as romantic, in the 1970s Rose Marie maintained a platonic relationship with Pussycat Theaters co-owner Vince Miranda.

In her later years, Rose Marie was active on social media, particularly developing a following on Twitter, where she offered support for women who, like her, had suffered from sexual harassment.

Death
Rose Marie died at her home in the Van Nuys neighborhood of Los Angeles on December 28, 2017, at the age of 94. Nell Scovell memorialized her as "the patron saint of female comedy writers".

Rose Marie's long-time friend and agent, Harlan Boll, says that the legendary actress's death had to do with "age problems." 

Boll was with Marie shortly before she passed away. He explained to reporters that Marie had lain down to rest on Thursday afternoon, and by the time her caregiver checked in on her, to see if she wanted something to eat, and discovered she had stopped breathing."

Partial filmography

Feature films

International House (1933) - Rose Marie
Top Banana (1954) - Betty Dillon
The Big Beat (1958) - May Gordon
Don't Worry, We'll Think of a Title (1966) - Annie
Dead Heat on a Merry-Go-Round (1966) - Margaret Kirby
Memory of Us (1974) - Ida
The Man From Clover Grove (1974) - Sister Mary
Bruce's Deadly Fingers (1976)
Cheaper to Keep Her (1980) - Ida Bracken
Lunch Wagon (1981) - Mrs. Schmeckler
Witchboard (1986) - Mrs. Moses
The Wonderful World of Jonathan Winters (1986) - Herself
Sandman (1993) - Car Saleswoman
Psycho (1998) - Norma Bates (voice, uncredited)
Lost & Found (1999) - Clara
Shriek If You Know What I Did Last Friday the Thirteenth (2000) - Mrs. Tingle
Surge of Power: The Stuff of Heroes (2004) - Herself
Forever Plaid (2008) - Herself

Short subjects

Baby Rose Marie the Child Wonder (1929) - Herself
Rambling 'Round Radio Row #4 (1932)
Sing, Babies, Sing (1933) - Herself
Back in '23 (1933) - Herself
Rambling 'Round Radio Row (1934) - Herself
At the Mike (1934) - Herself - Baby Rose Marie
Sally Swing (1938) - Sally Swing (voice, uncredited)
Surprising Suzie (1953) - Herself

Television

Gunsmoke (1957, Episode 94: "Twelfth Night") - Mrs. Monger
M Squad (1958, Episode 36; "The System") - Margo
The Bob Cummings Show (1958–1959, 9 episodes) - Martha Randolph
The Many Loves of Dobie Gillis (1960) - Mrs. Tarantino
My Sister Eileen (1960–1961) - Bertha
The Dick Van Dyke Show (1961–1966) - Sally Rogers
The Monkees (1966-1967) - Milly / The Big Man, Bessie Kowalski
The Virginian (1967) - Belle Stephens
Walter of the Jungle (1967) (unsold pilot)
My Three Sons (1968, Episode: "First Night Out") - Nurse Genevieve Goodbody
The Doris Day Show (cast member 1969–1971) - Myrna Gibbons
Honeymoon Suite (1972, 3 episodes) (with Morey Amsterdam)
Adam-12 (1972-1973) - Woman at Bus Depot in 1972 episode The Tip; Jean Wagner in 1973 episode Clear with a Civilian: Part 2
S.W.A.T. (1975) - Hilda
Kojak (1975) episode Two-Four-Six for Two Hundred - Mrs. Tildon
The Love Boat (1978-1984) - Beatrice Multon / Bertha Finch / Fourth Bridge Player / Dotty Price
Bridge Across Time (1985, TV Movie) - Alma Bellock
Remington Steele (1986, Series 4 Episode 17; "Steele in the Spotlight") - Billie Young
The Jackie Bison Show (1990, unsold pilot that aired on NBC) - Doris (voice)
Scorch (1992, canceled after three episodes)
2 Stupid Dogs (1993) - Mrs. Crabface (voice)
Ultraman: The Ultimate Hero (1993)
Hardball (1994, canceled after seven episodes) - Mitzi Balzer
Cagney & Lacey: Together Again (1995, TV Movie) - Mitzi Glass
Freakazoid! (1995) - Honna (voice) 
Caroline in the City ("Caroline and the Watch", with Morey Amsterdam (1996); "Caroline and the Kept Man" (1997)) - Stella Dawson
Wings (1997) - Eleanor Bluto Biggins
Suddenly Susan (1997) - Joy
Hey Arnold! (1998) - Agatha Caulfield (voice)
The Hughleys (2001) - Edna
Tracey Ullman in the Trailer Tales (2003) - Sylvia
The Alan Brady Show (2003, TV Movie) - The Secretary (voice)
The Dick Van Dyke Show Revisited (2004, TV Movie) - Sally Rogers Glimscher
The Garfield Show (2008–2013) - (voice)

Bibliography

References

External links

 An interview with Rose Marie, March 2011
 Rose Marie on RadioGoldIndex 
 
 
 
 

1923 births
2017 deaths
20th-century American actresses
20th-century American singers
20th-century American non-fiction writers
20th-century American women writers
21st-century American actresses
21st-century American singers
21st-century American non-fiction writers
21st-century American women writers
Actresses from New York City
American autobiographers
American child actresses
American child singers
American film actresses
American musical theatre actresses
American radio actresses
American television actresses
American writers of Italian descent
American people of Polish descent
Singers from New York City
Vaudeville performers
Writers from New York City
Women autobiographers
20th-century American women singers
American women non-fiction writers
21st-century American women singers
American women comedians